Jianguomen Subdistrict is a subdistrict located in the eastern portion of the Dongcheng District, Beijing, China. It contains 9 residential communities within its 2.7 km2 area, and as of 2020 its totoal population is 33,094.

The subdistrict is named after the Jianguomen, a gate on the eastern side of Beijing city wall that once stood in this region.

History

Administrative Division 
In 2021, there are 9 communities within the subdistrict:

Local Landmarks 

 Zhihua Temple
 Beijing Ancient Observatory
 Asbury Church

External links 
Official website (Archived)

References 

Subdistricts of Beijing
Dongcheng District, Beijing